Wola Rokietnicka  (Volia Roketnyts’ka) is a village in the administrative district of Gmina Rokietnica, within Jarosław County, Subcarpathian Voivodeship, in south-eastern Poland.

References

Wola Rokietnicka